Reeds & Deeds is an album by the jazz multi-instrumentalist Roland Kirk, released on the Mercury label in June 1963. It includes performances by Kirk with Virgil Jones, Charles Greenlee, Harold Mabern, Abdullah Rafik, Walter Perkins, Tom McIntosh and Richard Davis, with arrangements by Benny Golson.

Track listing
All compositions by Roland Kirk except as indicated.
 "Land of Peace" (Leonard Feather) - 5:52
 "Lonesome August Child" - 4:33
 "Limbo Boat" - 3:00
 "Hay Ro" - 3:02
 "Waltz of the Friends" - 4:40
 "This Is Always" (Harry Warren, Mack Gordon) - 4:17
 "Reeds and Deeds" - 5:18
 "Song of the Countrymen" - 6:54 
Recorded in New York on February 25 (tracks 1-5) and February 26 (tracks 6-8), 1963

Personnel
Roland Kirk: tenor saxophone, manzello, stritch, flute, siren
Virgil Jones: trumpet
Charles Greenlee: trombone (tracks 1–5)
Harold Mabern: piano
Abdullah Rafik: bass (tracks 1–5)
Walter Perkins: drums 
Tom McIntosh: trombone (tracks 6–8)
Richard Davis: bass (tracks 6–8)
Benny Golson: arranger (tracks 6–8)

References

1963 albums
Mercury Records albums
Rahsaan Roland Kirk albums